Campfire Café (also known as Campfire Café with Johnny Nix in its early days) is an American cooking show aired on RFD-TV. It has aired on the now defunct European TV channel, Rural TV. It, the original series, first aired on August 8, 2002 and was hosted by Albertville, Alabama native Johnny Nix at the time. The Nix version of the series ended sometime in early winter 2006.  The revival, which aired in June 2006, not long after the original series ended, is hosted by Pamela Alford and Larry Wiseheart. The series is currently on hiatus.

Celebrity Series
The Campfire Café Celebrity Series was first introduced during the 2005-2006 series, and again in 2011. Notable guests included country (and sometimes bluegrass) musicians Mark Chesnutt, Jett Williams, Mark Wills, Andy Griggs, John Conlee, Joe Diffie, the Kentucky Headhunters, Buddy Jewell, Ray Price, and the Roys.

Media releases and cookbook
The series has been released on DVD at least three times. In 2005, a cookbook based on the series, Over the Open Fire was written by Pamela Alford and Johnny Nix.

Spin-off
The series has spawned a spin-off, Cookin' Outdoors with Johnny Nix, which originally aired February 2012 on RURAL TV. It starred Nix in his hometown of Albertville, AL, cooking basically the same meals he would on the Campfire Café. As of the death of Nix’s wife, the series has been cancelled.

Trivia
There are three restaurants in the United States with the name Campfire Café, which includes, but are not limited to:
 Casper, Wyoming
 Scottsboro, Alabama
 Rimersburg, Pennsylvania

External links
Official site
Official Facebook page

2002 American television series debuts
2000s American cooking television series
2010s American cooking television series
English-language television shows
American television series revived after cancellation
Television shows set in Missouri
Bollinger County, Missouri
Country music television series
RFD-TV original programming